The Family-Ness is a British cartoon series first produced in 1983. It was originally broadcast on BBC One from 5 October 1984 to 5 April 1985, with repeats airing throughout most of the 90s and early 00s, eventually ending with a short run on CBeebies on BBC Two in early 2002. It was created by Peter Maddocks of Maddocks Cartoon Productions. Maddocks later went on to produce Penny Crayon and Jimbo and the Jet Set in a similar style. Family-Ness was about the adventures of a family of Loch Ness Monsters and the MacTout family, particularly siblings Elspeth and Angus. The 'Nessies' could be called from the loch by the two children by means of their "thistle whistles".

The series was followed with a large collection of merchandising including annuals, story books, character models and even a record. The single "You'll Never Find a Nessie in the Zoo" was written by Roger and Gavin Greenaway, but never made it into the Top 40.

Humans
Mr. MacTout Apparently the single parent to Angus and Elspeth (their mother is never seen or mentioned). A stereotypical Scotsman, he has ginger hair with a bushy beard, and he plays the bagpipes. He is the keeper of the loch, but never sees a Loch Ness Monster, and when anyone mentions seeing one, he says it is "stuff of nonsense". He also happily thinks it's the wind whenever he hears a thistle whistle and even in one episode tells another that he hears this sound once in a while.
Angus MacTout Seemingly older than his sister, Angus is adventurous, clever and quick and is usually successful in getting his father or one or several of the Nessies out of trouble when he needs to, though he sometimes underestimates the initiative of his sister, who often helps him.
Elspeth MacTout A friendly young girl who assists her brother in most of his adventures.
Sergeant MacFuzz The person most frequently approached when a Loch Ness Monster is seen.  However, he seldom believes it – in the first episode because it was April Fool's Day, on another occasion because a monster was reported to be water skiing (which was in fact the truth) and other occasions simply because he arrives too late to see anything himself. He has a bully-like son, Willie MacFuzz, who also once saw a Loch Ness Monster, but he didn't believe him either.
Mrs McToffee The keeper of the local sweet shop who is nevertheless careful not to sell too many sweets to young buyers in case they ruin their teeth.
Mayor and Mayoress Possibly the least intelligent of all the characters here, human or non-human. Obsessed with their own importance and their love for one another, they are oblivious to the Nessies, even when one of them is actually in front of them, standing in for a Loch Ness Monster's lookalike competition. A piece of ignorance by the scriptwriters since there are no Mayors in Scotland.
Professor Dumkopf A slightly mad scientist and hot air balloon pilot with a German-sounding accent who is set on proving the Loch Ness Monster's existence. He often does see one, but is always thwarted in proving it to anyone else either by the MacTout children or by the Nessies themselves (or both).  He has tried every bizarre method imaginable to succeed in his aim from lowering a telescopic camera into the loch to catch the monster on film (but ended up having the telescope twisted by the Nessies so that all he shot was a seagull in the air) to pumping sherbet into the loch to try to bring out a monster in a bubble (but ended up falling into his machine and being carried away in one himself). The name Dumkopf means "stupid head" in German.The name was later used in an episode of Inspector Gadget for an unrelated character who was also, coincidentally, a mad scientist.

Nessies
Most of the Nessies are named after their main trait, like the Mr. Men, the Smurfs and the dwarfs from Disney's Snow White and the Seven Dwarfs. With one exception, the Nessies bear little likeness to the stereotypical plesiosaurus/serpent appearance; most of them appear as very fat, yellowish dinosaurs with bulbous noses.
Ferocious-Ness The first Loch Ness Monster to interact with the MacTout children, and subsequently the most frequent to appear in the series. A large, khaki crocodile/dragon-like creature who likes frightening tourists and passers-by, he is otherwise generally friendly.  He is able to change colour to blend in with his background when on land (only seen in one episode) and can, when this happens, get stuck in whatever colour he chooses, but can be made to change back if confronted with something more frightening than himself, creepy-crawlies being his greatest fear.  He once – courtesy of the Mayor and Mayoress – came third in a Loch Ness Monster look-alike competition, much to his annoyance.
Her High-Ness The Queen of the Nessies, she originally made the rule that humans must not have dealings with Loch Ness Monsters, but when she saw how polite and helpful the children were, she made them the exception to the rule, and presented them with secret thistle whistles, to call them when necessary.  She was seen to breathe fire in just one episode, which she learned to do from "a cousin in China" (presumably a dragon), and on another occasion she stowed away in a ship to visit that cousin. She bears little physical similarities with the other Nessies, having the appearance of a stereotypical Loch Ness monster.
Baby-Ness The youngest Nessie with a dummy and nappy.  He has a surprisingly "sweet tooth" for one who has not yet started teething, as demonstrated once when Forgetful-Ness lost him, resulting in his crawling into the back door of Mrs McToffee's sweet shop to steal sweeties, and on another occasion when he had the measles and Angus and Elspeth bought him a whole jar of sticky sweets to cheer him up.
Careful-Ness An excessively cautious Nessie.
Clever-Ness The most intelligent of the Nessies, who sports a fine pair of spectacles.  Slightly old and doddering, but if called upon to assist the MacTout children in any way is usually successful in doing so.
Clumsy-Ness A well-meaning but accident-prone Nessie who wears a jumper and a winter hat. He was hit on the head by a boat, which caused him to stagger across a nearby sea scout camp and squash the tents.
Eager-Ness A slightly hyperactive Nessie who can get carried away, but is useful if the children want something done swiftly.
Forgetful-Ness A tie-wearing Nessie who, when he does call the children, sometimes even forgets that it was he who called. Having lost and then retrieved Baby Ness with the help of Angus and Elspeth, he remembered to express his gratitude but forgot what the baby's name was.
Eyewit-Ness Monster with a patch over one eye, who looks like a pirate.  He has a tendency to place his telescope over the wrong eye.
Grumpy-Ness An old grumbling Nessie who is the least grateful to hear and react to Angus and Elspeth's thistle-whistles, and perhaps for that reason is one of the least often seen.
Tidy-Ness Helps clean up the camp that was accidentally destroyed by Clumsy-Ness.
Heavy-Ness Strong monster, who wears circus "strong man" outfits. Teams up with Mighty Ness to pull Silly Ness free when he gets stuck.
Lovely-Ness The only female Nessie apart from her High Ness.  She has long, blonde hair.  A friendly Nessie, but often too dainty to help physically in a great deal of the adventures, and is therefore not often seen, though she does appear during the title credits.  
Mighty-Ness Another strong monster dressed in Circus Strongman clothes.  Often seen with Heavy Ness.  They may be identical twin brothers.
Naughty-Ness A trouble causing monster.
Silly-Ness Dim monster that's always getting into trouble. Often gets stuck in small holes and caves and was the first Nessie the children saw- albeit with his backside up in the air.
Speedy-Ness After Eager-Ness, generally the quickest to action, he is distinguished by his red crash helmet.
Sporty-Ness Appears in the opening credits, but seldom reacts to the MacTout children's thistle-whistles.  When he does appear he tends to show off. He is shown wearing a red and white striped T-shirt.
Hungry-Ness A Nessie who will eat anything, even diving bells!
Comfy Ness A puffy pink Nessie who cushioned Angus when he fell from a loose kite.
Thirsty-Ness An apparently constantly dehydrated Nessie who even drank a potion that made his bottom half disappear.

There are many unnamed Nessies used as background characters.

Credits
 Written and Created by  Peter Maddocks
 Voices by  Peter Hawkins, Susan Sheridan
 Music by  Roger and Gavin Greenaway
 Theme Tune Performed By  Roger Greenaway
 Animation by  The Animation People, Gingerbread Animation Ltd, Bill Melendez Productions, T.V Cartoons Ltd, Bob Godfrey Ltd, The Ness Company
 Head of Backgrounds  Kevin Smith
 Layout  Ted Pettengel and David Elvin
 Production by  Peter Maddocks, Nick Roberts, Gus Angus
 Series Director  Jack Stokes
 Dubbing by  MagMasters

Episodes

Home releases
In the middle of 1985 after the final episode of The Family Ness was broadcast. BBC Video released one video with 14 episodes of the entire show.

In the mid-1990s Hallmark and Carlton Home Entertainment released one video with the first 9 episodes of 1984.

In 2002 Right Entertainment (distributed through Universal Pictures (UK) Ltd) released two videos with eight episodes on each one and then in Summer 2004 they were both re-released on 2 DVD releases.

References

External links

1980s British children's television series
1984 British television series debuts
1985 British television series endings
BBC children's television shows
British children's animated comedy television series
Animated television series about children
Television series about single parent families
Animated television series about monsters
Television shows set in Scotland
Loch Ness Monster in television
English-language television shows
1980s British animated television series
CBeebies